Unsane is a 2018 film directed by Steven Soderbergh.

It may also refer to:

Unsane (band), an American noise rock band
Unsane (album), 1991 debut album by the band of the same name
Unsane, US release title of 1982 Italian film Tenebrae

See also 
 Insane